Magic Dam is an earthen embankment dam across the Big Wood River in southwestern Blaine County, Idaho, in the United States, about  north of Twin Falls. Water from the reservoir is used to irrigate  around and between Shoshone and Richfield. Magic Dam also supports a power station with three turbines totaling a capacity of 9,000 kW.

Two auxiliary dikes keep the reservoir from overflowing during high elevations, while a concrete emergency spillway located west of the dam helps to pass floodwaters.

See also
List of dams and reservoirs in Idaho

References

Dams in Idaho

United States power company dams
Buildings and structures in Blaine County, Idaho
Dams completed in 1910
Lakes of Blaine County, Idaho